Ochre is a natural pigment and associated color.

Ochre or Ocher may also refer to:
Ochre (musician) (born 1979), an artist
Mariya Ocher (born 1986), Russian singer-songwriter
Ochre River, Manitoba, in Canada
Ochre, a type of genetics stop codon
Ocher, alternative spelling of Ochyor, a town in Perm Krai, Russia

See also
Ogre (disambiguation)
Ocre, town in Italy